The MTV Europe Music Award for Best Urban was given out between the years 2007 and 2009. It has since been retired.

Winners and nominees
Winners are listed first and highlighted in bold.

2000s

References

MTV Europe Music Awards
Dance music awards
Awards established in 2007
Hip hop awards